Acrophtalmia is a genus of butterflies in the family Nymphalidae.

Species
Acrophtalmia artemis C. & R. Felder, 1861
Acrophtalmia leuce C. & R. Felder, [1867]
Acrophtalmia windorum Miller & Miller, 1978

External links
"Acrophtalmia C. & R. Felder, 1861" at Markku Savela's Lepidoptera and Some Other Life Forms

Ragadiini
Butterfly genera
Taxa named by Baron Cajetan von Felder
Taxa named by Rudolf Felder